Bubiyan Island is the largest island in the Kuwaiti coastal island chain situated in the north-western corner of the Persian Gulf, with an area of . Bubiyan Island is part of the Shatt al-Arab delta. The Mubarak Al Kabeer Port is currently under construction on the island. As part of Mubarak Al Kabeer Port's development, there are plans for Bubiyan Island to contain power plants and substations. A 5,000-megawatt power plant has already been built in the neighbouring Kuwaiti region of Subiya.

History

Antiquity
Bubiyan was formed by debris from the Tigris–Euphrates river. There is archaeological evidence of Sassanian (300–650 AD) to early Islamic (650–800 AD) periods of human presence on Bubiyan as evidenced by the recent discovery of torpedo-jar pottery sherds on several prominent beach ridges.

Gulf War
During the Gulf War of 1991, there was a big oil spill in the area; in addition to this, four spans of the bridge were destroyed; they were rebuilt in 1999. The island itself was converted to a military base in 1991. In November 1994, Iraq formally accepted the UN-demarcated border with Kuwait which had been spelled out in Security Council Resolutions 687 (1991), 773 (1992), and 833 (1993) which formally ended an earlier claim to Bubiyan Island. The Iranian mainland is also very close to the island.

Ramsar Convention
In response to Kuwait becoming the 169th signatory of the Ramsar Convention, the Mubarak al-Kabeer reserve was designated as the country's first Wetland of International Importance. The 50,948 hectare reserve consists of small lagoons and shallow salt marshes and is important as a stop-over for migrating birds on two migration routes; Turkey to India and Eurasia to Africa. Breeding water-birds include the world's largest breeding colony of Crab-plover (Dromas ardeola), and the surrounding sea is major nursery for many commercial fish species.

Geography
The island is mainly flat, while salt marshes cover some coasts. There are several intermittent wadis in the center of the island. It is separated from the Iraqi coast in the northeast by the Al-Zubayr channel and from the Kuwaiti mainland in the southwest by the Al-Sabiyyah channel.

During high spring tides and southerly gales the wet, low lying mud flats that make up most of the island are encroached upon by sea water. The island is considered to be at risk of inundation due to sea level rise.

Mubarak Al Kabeer Port

Mubarak Al Kabeer Port is part of China's Belt and Road Initiative. Under China's Belt and Road Initiative, the Mubarak Al Kabeer Port is part of the first phase of the Silk City project. In September 2020, it was reported that the port is 53% complete. In March 2021, it was announced that Kuwait and Pakistan will develop linkages between Gwadar Port and Mubarak Al Kabeer Port. The Mubarak Al Kabeer Port is currently under construction. As part of Mubarak Al Kabeer Port's development, Bubiyan Island will contain power plants and substations. A 5,000-megawatt power plant has already been built in Subiya.

In literature
The island is mentioned in the 1933 science fiction work The Shape of Things to Come by H. G. Wells, in which it provides the recreational facilities for a conference at Basra.

See also
 Battle of Bubiyan
 Economy of Kuwait
 Mubarak Al Kabeer Port
 Sheikh Jaber Al-Ahmad Al-Sabah Causeway
 Madinat al-Hareer
 Al Mutlaa City

References

External links
  

Islands of Kuwait
Disputed territories in the Persian Gulf
Iraq–Kuwait border
Islands of the Persian Gulf
Uninhabited islands of Kuwait
Ramsar sites in Kuwait
Archaeological sites in Kuwait